Dariga Shakimova (born 20 November 1988) is a Kazakhstani boxer. In 2015, she was named the Female Boxer of the Year by the Kazakhstan Boxing Federation. She won a bronze medal in the middleweight event at the 2016 Summer Olympics. Shakimova studied at the Kazakh Academy of Sport and Tourism. After seeing the film Million Dollar Baby, her mother wanted to ban her from boxing, fearing for a serious injury. Shakimova's coach persuaded her to reconsider.

References

External links

 

1988 births
Living people
Kazakhstani women boxers
Olympic boxers of Kazakhstan
Boxers at the 2016 Summer Olympics
Place of birth missing (living people)
Olympic bronze medalists for Kazakhstan
Olympic medalists in boxing
Medalists at the 2016 Summer Olympics
Middleweight boxers
21st-century Kazakhstani women